The 1913–14 international cricket season was from September 1913 to April 1914.

Season overview

December

England in South Africa

New Zealand in Australia

March

Australia in New Zealand

References

International cricket competitions by season
1913 in cricket
1914 in cricket